Most–Híd (from the Slovak and Hungarian words for "bridge") was an inter-ethnic political party in Slovakia. Its programme calls for greater cooperation between the country's Hungarian minority and ethnic Slovak majority.  It was one of four parties in the Fico III government coalition, but lost all its seats in the National Council in the 2020 Slovak parliamentary election.

The party was formed in June 2009 by dissidents from the Party of the Hungarian Coalition (SMK-MKP), which they accused of being too nationalistic. Most–Híd seeks to offer an alternative to ethnic politics by promoting inter-ethnic cooperation. Led by the SMK-MKP's former chairman Béla Bugár, the party claimed to have an electorate that is two-thirds ethnic Hungarian and one-third ethnic Slovak. The party remerged with SMK-MKP and a smaller Hungarian minority party (Unity) in late 2021 to form the Alliance.

History
The party was established on 30 June 2009 by Béla Bugár, Gábor Gál, László A. Nagy, Tibor Bastrnák and Zsolt Simon, who had previously left the Party of the Hungarian Coalition (SMK-MKP). Béla Bugár, who had also been the president of his former party for 10 years, was elected its president. It was established as an inter-ethnic Hungarian-Slovak alternative to the Party of the Hungarian Coalition. This commitment was cemented by electing Rudolf Chmel, an ethnic Slovak, as one of the party's vice presidents representing.

The party sought to represent the interests of the ethnic Hungarians while working together with the Slovaks. According to Peter Huncik about 60 to 65 percent members were Hungarians, while 35 to 40 were Slovaks. This programme and political ideology manifested itself in the party first taking part in the centre-right Radičová-government between 2010 and 2012, and also cooperating with the centre-left Fico government in minority issues in the next electoral cycle.

Polls from mid-September 2009 gave Most–Híd between 3 and 5.6 percent of the vote. An opinion poll by Focus in May 2010 gave Most–Híd 5.6% of the vote. In the 2010 election, the party received 8.12% of the popular vote, and thus won fourteen seats in the National Council. This, however, included four seats for Civic Conservative Party politicians running within the party's list of candidates. At the same time, Most–Híd's main rival, SMK-MKP, fell short of the 5% threshold and thus did not gain any seats.

In 2010, Most–Híd entered the four-party government of Iveta Radičová, and sought to advance its agenda, including in language rights, citizenship, agriculture and environmental policy. The government, however, turned out to be unstable and finally collapsed during October 2011, leading to snap elections. After months of steady polling between 6 and 9 percents, the party received 6.89% of the popular vote in the 2012 elections, winning 13 seats. As in 2010, SMK-MKP failed to reach the required threshold, leaving Most–Híd as the only parliamentary party representing the interest of the Hungarian minority in Slovakia.

In the 2014 European elections, Most–Híd came in eighth place nationally, receiving 5.83% of the vote and electing 1 MEP.

In the 2016 Slovak parliamentary election, Most–Híd received 6.50% of the vote – 11 seats – and joined Fico's Third Cabinet as a coalition partner.

Election results

National Council

European Parliament

Presidential

Footnotes

External links
Most–Híd official website

Centrist parties in Slovakia
Conservative parties in Slovakia
Defunct political parties in Slovakia
Liberal conservative parties in Slovakia
Hungarians in Slovakia
Political parties of minorities in Slovakia
Pro-European political parties in Slovakia
Political parties established in 2009
Political parties disestablished in 2021
2009 establishments in Slovakia
2021 disestablishments in Slovakia
Hungarian minority interests parties